Batuco is a locality of Chile, situated in the commune of Lampa

Populated places in Chacabuco Province